{{DISPLAYTITLE:C12H20O2}} 
The molecular formula C12H20O2 (molar mass: 196.29 g/mol) may refer to:

 Bornyl acetate
 Ethyl decadienoate
 Geranyl acetate
 Lavandulyl acetate
 Linalyl acetate
 Neryl acetate